Neue Zeitschrift für Systematische Theologie und Religionsphilosophie is a peer-reviewed academic journal in theology published by Walter de Gruyter. The journal publishes articles in English and German.

The journal is abstracted in the ATLA - Religion Database, BIBP - Base d'information bibliographique en patristique, BIBL - Biblical Bibliography of Lausanne, Celdes, CNPIEC, Dietrich's Index Philosophicus,  EBSCO: Academic Search, Academic Source, Elsevier: Scopus, Gale/Cengage: Academic One File, IBR Internationale Bibliographie der Rezensionen geistes- und sozialwissenschaftlicher Zeitschriftenliteratur, IBZ Internationale Bibliographie der geistes- und sozialwissenschaftlichen Zeitschriftenliteratur, Index Theologicus, INIST, ISI: Arts and Humanities Citation Index, Current Contents, Minerva,  ProQuest: Arts & Humanities, Religious and Theological Abstracts and Xolopo.

External links 
 

Christianity studies journals
Publications established in 1980
Quarterly journals
De Gruyter academic journals